Greener Grass, published in 2009, is the second novel of Canadian author Caroline Pignat. The story revolves around a 14-year-old girl, Kit Byrne, living during the Great Famine of 1847 in Ireland. The Byrne family faces imminent eviction when their landlord, Lord Fraser, wants to repossess their land. He attempts to drive them out by raising the rent and having his estate manager, Lynch, set fires in the surrounding area. Kit works as a kitchen maid in the main house, but when she loses her job her mother is forced to sell precious family heirlooms and furniture. With her father dead, she must fight for survival and help her ailing mother and siblings escape Ireland for good.

This story is a glimpse into the tragic events of the Great Hunger, the famine that devastated Ireland, forcing thousands of impoverished families to seek better livelihoods outside of their homeland.

Awards and nominations

References

2009 Canadian novels
2009 children's books
Canadian young adult novels
Children's historical novels
Fiction set in 1847
Governor General's Award-winning children's books
Novels set in Ireland
Works about the Great Famine (Ireland)